The Communauté de communes des Monts de la Goële is a former federation of municipalities (communauté de communes) in the Seine-et-Marne département and in the Île-de-France région of France. It was created in September 1991. It was merged into the Communauté d'agglomération du Pays de Meaux in January 2017.

Composition 
The Communauté de communes comprised the following communes:
Forfry
Gesvres-le-Chapitre
Monthyon
Saint-Soupplets

See also
Communes of the Seine-et-Marne department

References 

Former commune communities of Seine-et-Marne